Robert Victor Thornhill (24 July 1902 – 28 July 1963) was an English first-class cricketer.

Thornhill, who was born at Merton in July 1902, made a single appearance in first-class cricket for H. D. G. Leveson-Gower's XI against Oxford University at Reigate in 1934. Batting twice in the match, he was dismissed for 52 runs in the HDG Leveson-Gower's XI first-innings by Kenneth Jackson, while in their second-innings he was dismissed for 12 runs by Sandy Singleton. He was employed as a bank clerk. Thornhill died in July 1963 at Merton.

References

External links

1902 births
1963 deaths
English cricketers
H. D. G. Leveson Gower's XI cricketers